The 2022–23 Southern Utah Thunderbirds men's basketball team represents Southern Utah University in the 2022–23 NCAA Division I men's basketball season. The Thunderbirds, led by seventh-year head coach Todd Simon, play their home games at the America First Event Center in Cedar City, Utah, as first-year members of the Western Athletic Conference.

Previous season
The Thunderbirds finished the 2021–22 season 23–12, 14–6 in Big Sky play to finish in second place. In the Big Sky tournament, they were upset by No. 7 seed Portland State in the quarterfinals. They received an invitation to The Basketball Classic, where they defeated Kent State, UTEP, and Portland, before falling to Fresno State in the semifinals. This was the team's final season as a member of the Big Sky Conference, as they moved to the Western Athletic Conference, starting in the 2022–23 season.

Roster

Schedule and results

|-
!colspan=12 style=| Non-conference regular season

|-
!colspan=12 style=| WAC regular season

|-
!colspan=9 style=| WAC tournament

|-
!colspan=12 style=| College Basketball Invitational

Sources

References

Southern Utah Thunderbirds men's basketball seasons
Southern Utah
Southern Utah
Southern Utah Thunderbirds men's basketball
Southern Utah Thunderbirds men's basketball